The Head Waiter is a 1919 American silent comedy film featuring Oliver Hardy.

Cast
 Larry Semon as The Head Waiter
 Oliver Hardy as A Cop (credited as Babe Hardy)
 Lucille Carlisle as Cashier (credited as Lucille Zintheo)

See also
 List of American films of 1919
 Oliver Hardy filmography

External links

1919 films
1919 short films
1919 comedy films
American silent short films
American black-and-white films
Silent American comedy films
Films directed by Larry Semon
American comedy short films
1910s American films